Ismail Mohamed may refer to:
Ismail Mohamed (activist) (born 1983), Egyptian atheist human rights activist and host of The Black Ducks programme
Ismail Mohamed (football player) (born 1980), Maldivian football player
Ismail Mohamed Osman, Somalilander lawyer
Ismail Mohamed Said (born 1965), Malaysian politician
Ismail Selim Mohamed (born 1944), Egyptian basketball player
Ismail Mohamed (South African activist), South African mathematician and struggle activist; see Order of Mapungubwe

See also 
Ismaeel Mohammad (born 1990), Qatari professional footballer
Ismail Mahomed (born 1931), South African lawyer and co-author of the Constitution of Namibia
Ismail Ayob (Ismail Mahomed Ayob, born 1942), South African lawyer
Ismail Mohammed (disambiguation)
Mohamed Ismail (born 1967), Egyptian politician and lawyer
Mohamed Ismail (basketball) (born 1958), Egyptian basketball player